The Ecclesiastical Province of British Columbia and Yukon is one of four ecclesiastical provinces in the Anglican Church of Canada. It was founded in 1914 as the Ecclesiastical Province of British Columbia, but changed its name in 1943 when the Diocese of Yukon was incorporated from the Ecclesiastical Province of Rupert's Land. The territory covered by the province encompasses the civil province of British Columbia and Yukon. There are five dioceses and one "recognized territory [with] the status of a diocese" in the province:

 British Columbia, also known as the diocese of Islands and Inlets (British Columbia)
 Caledonia (British Columbia)
 Kootenay (British Columbia)
 New Westminster (British Columbia)
 Yukon (Yukon)
 Territory of the People (British Columbia)

The former Diocese of Cariboo's operations were suspended as a result of insolvency arising from liability judgements in the cases of abuse at residential schools operated by the Diocese. The parishes within her territory have been administered, as the Anglican Parishes of the Central Interior, by a suffragan bishop to the Metropolitan since 2004, and were became a "recognized territory [with] the status of a diocese" on November 14, 2015.

Provinces of the Anglican Church of Canada are headed by a Metropolitan, elected from among the province's diocesan bishops. This bishop then becomes Archbishop of his or her diocese and Metropolitan of the Province. The current Metropolitan of the Province of British Columbia and Yukon is Lynne McNaughton of the Diocese of Kootenay.

Metropolitans of British Columbia and Yukon

Suffragan bishops to the Metropolitan
Gordon Light (2004–2008)
Barbara Andrews (2009–2020)

See also

Ecclesiastical provinces of the Anglican Church of Canada
List of dioceses of the Anglican Church of Canada

References

External links
 The British Columbia and Yukon Anglican Youth Movement - The BCYAYM is the Anglican youth movement of the ecclesiastical province of BC and Yukon. The fall conference has taken place at Canadian Thanksgiving for more than 50 years.

 
Anglican archbishops in Canada
Organizations based in British Columbia
Christian organizations established in 1914
Christian organizations established in 1943
Christianity in British Columbia
Christianity in Yukon
Ecclesiastical provinces of the Anglican Church of Canada